in Chōfu, Tokyo is a Japanese women's professional shogi player ranked 4-dan. She is a former  title holder.

Promotion history
Kagawa has been promoted as follows.
 2-kyū: October 1, 2008
 1-kyū: July 25, 2009
 1-dan: November 28, 2012
 2-dan: August 29, 2013
 3-dan: October 23, 2013
 4-dan: January 21, 2021

Note: All ranks are women's professional ranks.

Major titles
Kagawa has appeared in major title matches four times and has won a total of two titles. She won the  title in 2013 and then successfully defended it in 2014.

Awards and honors
Kagawa received the Japan Shogi Association Annual Shogi Award "Women's Professional Most Games Played" in 2013 and the "Women's Professional Award" in 2014.

References

External links
 ShogiHub: Professional Player Info · Kagawa, Manao
 
 YouTube: 女流棋士・香川愛生チャンネル

1993 births
Japanese shogi players
Living people
Women's professional shogi players

People from Chōfu, Tokyo
Professional shogi players from Tokyo Metropolis
Women's Ōshō
Shogi YouTubers
Japanese YouTubers